Janet Wall (born November 21, 1949) is an American politician in the state of New Hampshire. She is a member of the New Hampshire House of Representatives, sitting as a Democrat from the Strafford 6 district, having been first elected in 1986.

References

1949 births
Living people
Democratic Party members of the New Hampshire House of Representatives
20th-century American politicians
20th-century American women politicians
21st-century American politicians
21st-century American women politicians